Esteban Joaquín Salinas (born 18 January 1992) is a Chilean handball player for Bidasoa Irún and the Chilean national team.

His brother Rodrigo Salinas Muñoz als plays handball.

Individual Awards and Achievements
2016 Pan American Men's Handball Championship: Best Pivot
2018 Pan American Men's Handball Championship: Best Pivot
2020 South and Central American Men's Handball Championship: Best Pivot

References

1992 births
Living people
Chilean male handball players
Handball players at the 2011 Pan American Games
Handball players at the 2015 Pan American Games
Handball players at the 2019 Pan American Games
Pan American Games silver medalists for Chile
Pan American Games bronze medalists for Chile
Pan American Games medalists in handball
Expatriate handball players
Chilean expatriate sportspeople in Spain
Liga ASOBAL players
Sportspeople from Viña del Mar
South American Games bronze medalists for Chile
South American Games medalists in handball
Competitors at the 2018 South American Games
Medalists at the 2015 Pan American Games
Medalists at the 2019 Pan American Games
Medalists at the 2011 Pan American Games
20th-century Chilean people
21st-century Chilean people